Al Fida is an arrondissement of Casablanca, in the Al Fida - Mers Sultan district of the Casablanca-Settat region of Morocco. As of 2004 it had 186,754 inhabitants. It contains the municipality of Mechouar.

References

Arrondissements of Casablanca